"Großvater" ("grandfather") is a song recorded in 1985 by Austrian pop rock group S.T.S. In this song - which reached #63 in Austria - Steinbäcker sings about the loving relationship to his grandfather.

1986 singles
S.T.S. songs
1985 songs